"King William's March" is a work by the English Baroque  composer Jeremiah Clarke (1674-1707).

It was composed in honour of William of Orange who had become King of England following the Glorious Revolution of 1688. Clarke's better known "Prince of Denmark's March" honoured William's brother-in-law Prince George of Denmark.

References

Bibliography
 Palmer, Willard A. Essential Keyboard Repertoire, Volume 7. Alfred Music.

Compositions by Jeremiah Clarke
British military marches
William III of England